Choper, Coffee, Gilson refers to the casebook entitled Cases and Materials on Corporations, edited by Jesse H. Choper, John C. Coffee, Jr., and Ronald J. Gilson.  Its current (seventh) edition was published in 2008.

References

Casebooks